Alexandru Pelici (born 10 January 1974) is a Romanian former professional footballer and currently a manager. He was most recently in charge of Liga I club Mioveni.

Player career 
He started the player career in his hometown, Timișoara, at Progresul, then he moved at Electrica, eventually reaching in 1994 the most important team from Timișoara, Politehnica. He played for Poli until 1999 (93 matches and scored 3 goals) when he moved to another team from Banat, CSM Reșița. Pelici ended his career in 2002 at only 28 years old due to repeated knee injuries, his last club as a football player was Unirea Alba Iulia, at that time known as Apulum.

Manager career 
After the retirement Pelici started immediately his manager career as the assistant of Aurel Șunda, Unirea's manager at that time. At the end of the first season Unirea promoted to Divizia A for the first time in its history. At just 30 years old he was appointed the manager at Unirea Alba Iulia and many thought the team would relegated. It did not happen at all, and Unirea finished on 6th place in Divizia A, the best ranking in the history of the club. For 10 years he held the record of the youngest league coach. After this his career took place mostly at the level of the Liga II at clubs like: CSM Reșița, Forex Brașov, Arieșul Turda, Târgu Mureș, Voința Sibiu, Metalul Reșița, Bihor Oradea or Mioveni. The most he spent two years at Voința Sibiu and Râmnicu Vâlcea, with the first getting a promotion and a Liga I season. Pelici also had a quick crossing in Liga I at Brașov and currently he is the manager of Hermannstadt, the latest Sibiu born football club, being on a promotion spot after 21 rounds in the 2017–18 Liga II season.

Honours

Player

Politehnica Timișoara
Divizia B (1): 1994–95

Coach

Hermannstadt Sibiu
Liga II runner-up: 2017–18
Cupa Romaniei runner-up: 2017–18

Personal life
Alexandru Pelici is the son of the popular folk singer Mariana Drăghicescu.

References

External links
 
 

1974 births
Living people
Sportspeople from Timișoara
Romanian footballers
Association football defenders
Association football midfielders
Liga I players
Liga II players
FC Politehnica Timișoara players
CSM Reșița players
CSM Unirea Alba Iulia players
Romanian football managers
Liga I managers
Liga II managers
CSM Unirea Alba Iulia managers
CSM Reșița managers
ASA 2013 Târgu Mureș managers
CS Sportul Snagov managers
FC Brașov (1936) managers
FC Bihor Oradea managers
CS Mioveni managers
FC Hermannstadt managers
FC Ripensia Timișoara managers